United Schools of Peru (USP) is an inter-school student club headquartered in Lima, Peru, aimed to promote debate and discussion on current national and international issues in order to form leading citizens who contribute to development by participating in Model United Nations (MUN) conferences. Beginning its participation in international conferences in 2016, it gained widespread recognition by achieving in their debut the Best International Delegation award at the Ivy League Model United Nations Conference organized by the International Affairs Association of the University of Pennsylvania, achieving the title in the 2016, 2018, 2019 and 2020 editions.

United Schools of Peru is one of the founding projects led by the Promotora Internacional de Debates - Perú (PRIDE Peru for its Spanish acronym) associates.

Faculty Advisors
Senior Advisors in bold

2015–2016 season

2016–2017 season

2017–2018 season

2018–2019 season

2019–2020 season

Ivy League Model United Nations Conference Participation

WFUNA International Model United Nations Participation

Invitational Model United Nations Circuit Conferences Participation

Boston Invitational Model United Nations Conference (BosMUN)

North American Invitational Model United Nations (NAIMUN)

References

Debating societies